Aulax is a South African Proteaceae genus of just three species of evergreen shrubs commonly known as "featherbushes". The name Aulax was named by a botanist named Linnaeus; he named Aulax after the Greek god Proteus, who is known to inherit the ability to change his shape at will. It is unusual among the many South African Proteaceae in having male and female flowers on separate plants. The bushes have fine needle-like foliage. In spring and summer female plants produce funnel-shaped Leucospermum-like flowerheads that develop into seed cones. The catkin-like male flowers are yellow.

Species
Described species are listed below:
 Aulax cancellata (L.) Druce, 1753, 1914 - Channel-leaf featherbush
 Aulax pallasia Stapf, 1912 - Needle-leaf featherbush
 Aulax umbellata (Thunb.) R.Br., 1781, 1810 - Broad-leaf or fluffy featherbush

Cultivation
In all respects except frost hardiness, these are tough plants. They tolerate extreme heat, very low humidity, and prolonged drought. Like virtually all Proteaceae plants, they grow best on a light gritty soil with good drainage. They propagate from seed or half-hardened late summer-autumn cuttings.

References

Botanica Sistematica

Proteaceae
Flora of South Africa
Proteaceae genera